This is a list of members of the Victorian Legislative Council from the elections of 1 September – 2 October 1862 to the elections of 2 September – 3 October 1864.

There were six Electoral Provinces and five members elected to each Province.

Note the "Term in Office" refers to that members term(s) in the Council, not necessarily for that Province.

 Bennett resigned May 1863, replaced by John Pinney Bear in June 1863
 Coppin resigned February 1863, replaced by Caleb Jenner in March 1863
 Kennedy died 29 February 1864, replaced by William Taylor in an April 1864 by-election
 Stewart died 2 August 1863, replaced by James Denham Pinnock in a January 1864 by-election
 Thomson died 15 November 1863, replaced by Robert Turnbull in a January 1864 by-election

References

 Re-member (a database of all Victorian MPs since 1851). Parliament of Victoria.

Members of the Parliament of Victoria by term
19th-century Australian politicians